Khon Kaen University or KKU (มข.) is a public research university, and it is one of the most prestigious universities in Thailand. The university was the first institution of higher education in the northeastern Thailand and remains the oldest and the most competitive university in the region. The university is a hub of education in northeast Thailand. It is a widely recognized university in Asia with strong emphasis on medicine, engineering, science, agriculture and social science. Khon Kaen University was ranked 21st in Southeast Asia by Time Higher Education in 2009, and 4th in Thailand by The Office of Higher Education Commission.

History
In 1941 during the reign of King Ananda Mahidol with the government of Field Marshal Plaek Phibunsongkhram as Prime Minister, there have been policies and projects to expand higher education to the provinces. For the northeastern region, a university have been established in Ubon Ratchathani Province but the war in East Asia which the government had to decide to join Japan to fight the Allies. As a result, the establishment of a university in the northeastern region ended in 1960. Under the administration of Prime Minister Sarit Thanarat, there has been a review of the establishment of the university once again.

Later in the year 1962, it was resolved to establish a higher education institution. Engineering and agriculture in Khon Kaen nominate this institute as "Khon Kaen Institute of Technology" with the abbreviation K.I.T. After that its name was changed to be "Northeastern University" or N.E.U". At that time there was no government agency directly responsible for conducting university education. Therefore, the government has decided that the National Education Council should be responsible for finding a place, drafting a course as well as contacting foreign aids.

In 1963, the subcommittee agreed to choose Baan Si Than as the location of the university in an area of ​​approximately 5,500 rai (2,173 acres), 4 kilometers from the city of Khon Kaen. In June 9, 1964, building construction of "Faculty of Science and Arts" was settled. The first batch of the students was accepted at the University Office in Bangkok in June 24, 1964 with a total number of 107 students, separating into 49 agricultural science students and 58 engineering students enrolled at the University of Medical Sciences (current Mahidol University)

In 1965, the cabinet resolved to change the name as "Khon Kaen University" which is the city's name and location, and Khon Kaen University became legal entity since then.

In 1966, the parliament enacted the Khon Kaen University Act, and announced the establishment in the Government Gazette on January 25, 1966, which is considered the university's founding day. The King Bhumibol Adulyadej appointed qualified members of the university board. Prime Minister Thanom Kittikachorn and Khon Kaen University Council members held a meeting and appointed Pote Sarasin as the first president of the university.

Faculty 
There are 19 faculties and 4 colleges in three disciplines.

 Healthcare Science
 Faculty of Associated Medical Sciences
 Faculty of Dentistry
 Faculty of Medicine
 Faculty of Nursing
 Faculty of Pharmacy
 Faculty of Veterinary Medicine
 Faculty of Public Health

 Science and Technology
 Faculty of Agriculture
 Faculty of Technology
 Faculty of Architecture
 Faculty of Engineering
 Faculty of Science
 College of Computing

 Liberal Arts and Social Sciences
 Faculty of Education
 Faculty of Humanities and Social Sciences
 Faculty of Business Administration and Accountancy
 Faculty of Fine Arts
 Faculty of Law
 Faculty of Economics
 College of Local Administration
 KKU International College
 College of Graduate Study in Management
 Faculty of Interdisciplinary Studies (Nongkhai Campus)

Award and rankings  

2010 Khon Kaen University was rated as one of the 9 National Research Universities of Thailand.

International collaboration
 University of Georgia, USA, 
  College of Health Sciences Ahmad Yani Yogyakarta, 
 South West University or Xinan University, 
 Adelaide University, 
 Deakin University, 
 Gifu University, 
 Hue University, 
 International University, 
 Kochi University, 
 Kyoto University, 
 Nanzan University, 
 National University of Laos, 
 Mie University, 
 Muhammadiyah University, 
 University of Tsukuba, Japan, 
 Osaka University, 
 Saga University, 
 Thai Nguyen University, 
 University of Canberra, 
 University of Sydney, 
 Fujita Health University, 
 National University of Singapore, 
Vietnam National University of Agriculture,

Notable alumni
Somsak Kiatsuranont: Former Speaker of the House of Representatives of Thailand
Surapong Tovichakchaikul: Former Minister of Foreign Affairs of Thailand
Kobchai Sungsitthisawad: Permanent Secretary, Ministry of Industry (Thailand), CEO
Chinnapat Phumrat: Former Permanent Secretary, Ministry of Education (Thailand)
Chote Trachu: Permanent Secretary, Ministry of Tourism and Sports (Thailand)
Chanchai Panthongwiriyakul:President of Khon Kaen University, Pediatrician
Watcharin Kasalak: President of Burapha University
Witoon suriyawanakul : Billionaire and Founder of Siam Global House Pcl.
Adisak Tangmitrphracha : Billionaire and Founder of DoHome Plc.
Peerapong Jaroon-ek : CEO and founder of Origin Property Plc.
Taweesin Visanuyothin: Psychiatrist
Apisamai Srirangsan: Psychiatrist, News Anchor
Apichatpong Weerasethakul: film director, screenwriter, and film producer
Sukollawat Kanarot: Thai Actor
Tanwarin Sukkhapisit: Film director, politician
Harin Suthamjarus: Singer of Tattoo Colour
Niane Sivongxay: herpetologist
Jatupat Boonpattararaksa: Social Activist

Footnotes

 
Educational institutions established in 1964
Buildings and structures in Khon Kaen province
1964 establishments in Thailand